Tiberius Claudius Patrobius (1st century AD) was an ancient athlete from Antioch in Syria, who was a 3-time Olympic champion in the sport of wrestling, according to the 207th (49 AD), 208th (53 AD), and 209th (57 AD) Ancient Olympic Games. He was also victorious in wrestling at Nemea and Isthmia, and was an honorary citizen of the city of Alexandria.

His career length was estimated at 15 years. Some sources mention victories at Antioch Olympic festival and that he may have been periodonikes.

References

External links
Tiberius Claudius Patrobius at Olympedia

Ancient Nemean athletes
Ancient Isthmian athletes
Roman-era Olympic competitors